Daniel Emilfork (7 April 1924 – 17 October 2006) was a Chilean stage and film actor who made his career in France.

Biography
Emilfork was born in San Felipe, Chile after his Jewish socialist parents from Kiev fled a pogrom in Odessa. At age 25, he left Chile and settled in France, because, according to his friend Alejandro Jodorowsky, he didn't feel comfortable being a homosexual man in Chile.

Emilfork's face was out of the norm and had made him a choice character actor for films such as The City of Lost Children (1995). He specialized in roles of villains. Previously he had played in The Devil's Nightmare (1971), Travels with My Aunt (1972) and Fellini's Casanova (1976), in Roman Polanski's Pirates (1986) and in Taxandria (1994). He carried on acting up until his death, his last film appearing in 2007.

He died in Paris, France.

Selected filmography

 School for Love (1955) - Le professeur de violon
 Frou-Frou (1955) - Le critique en peinture (uncredited)
 Sophie et le Crime (1955) - Le barman du Montana (uncredited)
 The Hunchback of Notre Dame (1956) - Andry le Rouge
 No Sun in Venice (1957)
 Les Espions (1957) - Helmut Petersen
 La Parisienne (1957) - Un huissier d'ambassade (uncredited)
 Maigret Sets a Trap (1958) - Manic (uncredited)
 Le Temps des œufs durs (1958) - L'expert en tableaux
 Goha (1958) - L'aveugle Ibrahim
 Sans famille (1958) - George, le valet de Milligan
 Les Motards (1959) - L'espion aux pompes funèbres
 Les Tripes au soleil (1959)
 Du rififi chez les femmes (1959) - Luigi le Napolitain
 Pantalaskas (1960) - Le baron
 Le Bal des espions (1960) - Un tueur
 Tintin and the Golden Fleece (1960) - Voice dubbing (uncredited)
 The Triumph of Michael Strogoff (1961) - Ben Routh
 Le Rendez-vous de minuit (1962) - Le joueur de baccara
 La Poupée (1962) - Gant de Crin
 Les Bricoleurs (1963) - Igor, le majordome
 Jeff Gordon, Secret Agent (1963) - Yanakos - le grec
 Seul... à corps perdu (1963) - Le valet de chambre
 Ballade pour un voyou (1963) - Molok
 OSS 117 se déchaîne (1963) - Sacha
 Nutty, Naughty Chateau (1963) - Gunther
 Commissaire mène l'enquête (1963) - L'aveugle (segment "Fermez votre porte")
 Mission to Venice (1964) - Mr. Coliso
 L'assassin viendra ce soir (1964) - Le chef du gang des pompes funèbres
 What's New Pussycat? (1965) - Gas Station man
 L'Or du duc (1965) - Le gardien
 The Liquidator (1965) - Gregory
 Dis-moi qui tuer (1965) - Teotihuacan
 Lady L (1965) - Kobeleff
 Trans-Europ-Express (1966) - Phony Policeman
 Lotus Flowers for Miss Quon (1967) - Inspector Gonsart
 The Unknown Man of Shandigor (1967) - Herbert Von Krantz -le savant
 Midi minuit (1970) - Robert Lorrain
 The Devil's Nightmare (1971) - Satan
 Kill! Kill! Kill! Kill! (1971) - Mejid
 Travels with My Aunt (1972) - Colonel Hakim
 Fellini's Casanova (1976) - Marquis Du Bois
 Who Is Killing the Great Chefs of Europe? (1978) - Saint-Juste
 The Thief of Baghdad (1978) - The Genie
 Subversion (1979) - Cagliostro
 Deux heures moins le quart avant Jésus-Christ (1982) - Tatouius
 Meurtres à domicile (1982) - Julius Zepernick
 La Belle captive (1983) - Inspector Francis
 Pirates (1986) - Hendrik
 The Passage (1986) - La Mort (uncredited)
 The Tribulations of Balthazar Kober (1988) - Le recteur
 Artcore oder Der Neger (1993)
 Taxandria (1994) - First Minister
 The Flying Dutchman (1995) - Ketterjager
 The City of Lost Children (1995) - Krank
 Babel (1999) - Yatscov's Voice
 Les Frères Sœur (2000) - André
 Let's Dance (2007) - Le médecin militaire (final film role)

References

External links
 
 Fragments d'un dictionnaire amoureux

1924 births
2006 deaths
Chilean Jews
Jewish French male actors
Gay Jews
Chilean gay actors
Chilean people of Ukrainian-Jewish descent
French people of Ukrainian-Jewish descent
Chilean emigrants to France
Chilean male film actors
French male film actors
French gay actors
French male stage actors
20th-century Chilean LGBT people
21st-century Chilean LGBT people
20th-century French LGBT people
21st-century French LGBT people